Memory Crash is the third studio album by guitarist and songwriter Steve Stevens, released on January 29, 2008, through Magna Carta Records.

Background
Memory Crash comes some eight years after Stevens' previous solo album, Flamenco A Go-Go. It is a mostly instrumental album with help from Doug Pinnick of King's X, and featuring drummer Brian Tichy. Stevens and Tichy had previously worked together with Billy Idol.

Musical genres and influences
Stevens has put a lot of "weird little segues" into this album, a feature that has impressed him from albums such as Pink Floyd's Dark Side of the Moon. Other influences include Jimi Hendrix, particularly on Stevens' interpretation of Robin Trower's Day of the Eagle, as well as Led Zeppelin, King Crimson, and even Emerson, Lake & Palmer, Bo Diddley, and Jeff Beck. Stevens has said that he spent a lot of time listening to bands such as Pink Floyd and Yes prior to making this album, "just soaking up what made them tick". During the recording, Stevens used the Marshall Half Stack he had previously used while recording Rebel Yell with Billy Idol.

Record label Magna Carta describes this album as, "...an electro-centric sonic tour de force... No gimmicks. No over-the-top production. No compromising... Just Steve Stevens, his guitar, and his beloved effects..."

Track listing

Personnel
Steve Stevens – vocals (track 10), guitar, bass (except track 5), engineering, production
Doug Pinnick – vocals (track 5), bass (track 5)
Brian Tichy – drums, percussion
Beazle T. Monk – engineering
Michael Parnin – engineering, mixing
Josh Hertz – engineering
Mike Bozzi – engineering

References

External links
In Review: Steve Stevens "Memory Crash" at Guitar Nine Records

Steve Stevens albums
2008 albums
Magna Carta Records albums